Johann Gottfried Walther (18 September 1684 – 23 March 1748) was a German music theorist, organist, composer, and lexicographer of the Baroque era.

Walther was born at Erfurt.  Not only was his life almost exactly contemporaneous to that of Johann Sebastian Bach, he was the famous composer's cousin.

Walther was most well known as the compiler of the Musicalisches Lexicon (Leipzig, 1732), an enormous dictionary of music and musicians.  Not only was it the first dictionary of musical terms written in the German language, it was the first to contain both terms and biographical information about composers and performers up to the early 18th century. In all, the Musicalisches Lexicon defines more than 3,000 musical terms; Walther evidently drew on more than 250 separate sources in compiling it, including theoretical treatises of the early Baroque and Renaissance. The single most important source for the work was the writings of Johann Mattheson, who is referenced more than 200 times.

Some further information on Walther can be found in the book Musica Poetica by Dietrich Bartel. On page 22, Bartel quotes Walther's definition of musica poetica, or musical rhetoric, as:

"Musica Poetica or musical composition is a mathematical science through which an agreeable and correct harmony of the notes is brought to paper in order that it might later be sung or played, thereby appropriately moving the listeners to Godly devotion as well as to please and delight both mind and soul…. It is so called because the composer must not only understand language as does the poet in order not to violate the meter of the text but because he also writes poetry, namely a melody, thus deserving the title Melopoeta or Melopoeus." (22)

Walther was the music teacher of Prince Johann Ernst von Sachsen-Weimar. He wrote a handbook for the young prince with the title Praecepta der musicalischen Composition, 1708. It remained handwritten until Peter Benary's edition (Leipzig, 1955). As an organ composer, Walther became famous for his organ transcriptions of orchestral concertos by contemporary Italian and German masters. He made 14 transcriptions of concertos by Albinoni, Gentili, Taglietti, Giuseppe Torelli, Vivaldi and Telemann. These works were the models for Bach to write his famous transcriptions of concertos by Vivaldi and others. On the other hand, Walther as a city organist of Weimar wrote exactly 132 organ preludes based on Lutheran chorale melodies. Some free keyboard music also belongs to his legacy.

Notable recordings
 Johann Gottfried Walther: Complete Organ Music (2015). Simone Stella (organ).  12 cd box Brilliant Classics BC 94730
 , this is the first and only complete recording.

Media

References
Bartel, Dietrich. Musica Poetica: Musical-Rhetorical Figures in German Baroque Music. Lincoln: University of Nebraska Press, 1997.
Walther, Johann Gottfried: Musicalisches Lexicon oder Musicalische Bibliothec [1732] - Neusatz des Textes und der Noten. Hrsg.: Friederike Ramm. Kassel: Baerenreiter, 2001. (Version at Wikimedia Commons)
Walther, Johann Gottfried: Briefe. Hrsg.: Klaus Beckmann und Hans-Joachim Schultze. Leipzig: VEB Deutscher Verlag für Musik, 1987.

External links

Musicians from Erfurt
German music theorists
German classical organists
Composers for pipe organ
Organists and composers in the North German tradition
German male organists
German Baroque composers
18th-century keyboardists
18th-century classical composers
German male classical composers
1684 births
1748 deaths
18th-century German composers
18th-century German male musicians
Male classical organists